Wang Kelian is a village in Perlis, Malaysia located on the Malaysia-Thailand Border. The village was popular with tourists as it was the location of a border market, which straddles both sides of the border. However, it has lost it popularity following the discovery of mass graves of the victims of human trafficking in the area in 2015, for which it is now known for. It is also the location of a minor border crossing into Thailand.

Geography
Wang Kelian is located in the northern part of the Malaysian state of Perlis, and is one of the northernmost villages in Peninsular Malaysia. Wang Kelian is located at the foot of the karstic Nakawan Range and is surrounded by mogotes. Coming from Kaki Bukit and the rest of Perlis, Perlis State Route R15 has to climb over a low pass to reach Wang Kelian.

Perlis State Route R15 connects Wang Kelian with the rest of Perlis via the small town of Kaki Bukit about 10 km south. The border crossing into Thailand is located about 4 km north of Wang Kelian village. Padang Besar, where Perlis' main border crossing into Thailand is located, is 20 km away while Kangar, the state capital, is 33 km to the south.

At the border crossing, Road R15 connects to Route 4184 which joins Route 406, the main road to Satun town.

Attractions

Border market
The village was a popular destination for tourists and locals, because there is a huge market on both sides of the border. The governments of Malaysia and Thailand allow people to move freely across the border to shop within the confines of the market without the need for any documents. Malaysians need to produce their identification card to cross border, while Thai nationals can cross without any documentation. Document-free visitors are confined to 1 km radius from the border crossing.

The popularity of the market however took a hit as the Malaysian government tightened border crossing procedures following the discovery of mass graves of the victims of human trafficking and illegal transit camps in the nearby jungles in 2015. In April that year, the Malaysian government stopped the free flow of cross-border visitors, as this was reportedly exploited by the human traffickers to bring the victims into Malaysia from Thailand.

Perlis State Park
Wang Kelian is usually used as a base for visits to the Perlis State Park.

Border crossing
Wang Kelian is also the location of one of two border crossings between Malaysia and Thailand in the state of Perlis, with the other one at Padang Besar. The village across the border from Wang Kelian is Wang Prachan in Khuan Don District, Satun province, Southern Thailand where the immigration checkpoint is located.

A small duty-free shop is located beside the immigration checkpoint.

Wang Kelian Mass Graves
In 2015, mass graves of people believed to be Rohingyas who were victims of human trafficking were discovered in jungles north Wang Kelian in an area called Wang Burma. Reports stated that as many as 139 graves and 29 illegal detention camps were discovered during operations carried out by the Malaysia police. Conflicting reports have emerged as to when the Malaysian police had knowledge of the camps and accusations of a cover-up by the police have also been made as reports emerged that the camps were destroyed before investigations were completed. A Royal Commission of Inquiry was set up by the Malaysian government in 2019. In December 2021, a member of parliament called for the report of the inquiry to be made public.

References

 See also website: www.wangkelian.weebly.com (Official Kampung Wang Kelian Website). Author by Fakhrul Yaacob™.

Malaysia–Thailand border crossings
Towns in Perlis